The Lion and the Mouse is a lost 1919 American silent drama film produced and released by the Vitagraph Company of America. It was directed by Tom Terriss and based on the famous Charles Klein play. Alice Joyce starred in the film.

Previously filmed in 1914, the story was later remade at the dawn of sound in 1928 by Vitagraph's purchaser Warner Brothers as The Lion and the Mouse with Lionel Barrymore.

Plot
As described in a film magazine, John Burkett Ryder (Randolf), "the richest man in the world," seeks to discredit a judicial decision which works against his financial interests by discrediting its author, Judge Rossmore (Hallam), and has impeachment charges initiated against the judge in Congress. Shirley Rossmore (Joyce), the judge's daughter, learns of her father's trouble and returns from Paris, where she has won success as an author. She is loved by Jefferson Ryder (Nagel), son of the magnet. Determined to force the millionaire's hand, she publishes The American Octopus under a pseudonym with a main character based upon Burkett. He is attracted by the book and brings its author Shirley, whom he knows as Sarah Green, into his home to write his biography. She uses this opportunity as the chance to obtain two letters that will clear her father's name. Jefferson aids her in obtaining the documents, but is discovered and denounced as a thief. Shirley cannot allow the man she loves so branded, so she reveals her identity. The millionaire "lion" had already been won over by the charm of the "mouse," so there is a happy resolution.

Cast
Alice Joyce – Shirley Rossmore
Conrad Nagel – Jefferson Ryder
Anders Randolf – John Burkett Ryder
Henry Hallam – Judge Rossmore
William T. Carleton – Sen. Roberts (*as W. T. Carlton)
Mona Kingsley – Kate Roberts
Jane Jennings – Mrs. Ryder
W. H. Burton – Judge Scott
Templar Saxe – Fitzroy Bagley (*as Templer Saxe)
Mary Carr – Eudoxia

References

External links

1919 films
American silent feature films
Lost American films
American films based on plays
1919 drama films
Films based on fables
Silent American drama films
American black-and-white films
1919 lost films
Lost drama films
Films directed by Tom Terriss
1910s American films